Law and Order is a 1942 American Western film directed by Sam Newfield and written by Sam Robins. The film stars Buster Crabbe, Al St. John, Dave O'Brien, Sarah Padden, Wanda McKay and Charles King. The film was released on August 21, 1942, by Producers Releasing Corporation.

Plot

Cast           
Buster Crabbe as Billy the Kid / Lt. Ted Morrison
Al St. John as Fuzzy Jones
Dave O'Brien as Jeff 
Sarah Padden as Aunt Mary Todd
Wanda McKay as Linda Fremont
Charles King as Mil Crawford
Hal Price as Simms
John Merton as Turtle
Kenne Duncan as Durgan 
Ted Adams as Sheriff Jeff

References

External links
 

1942 films
American Western (genre) films
1942 Western (genre) films
Producers Releasing Corporation films
Films directed by Sam Newfield
American black-and-white films
1940s English-language films
1940s American films